Limbo is a 1972 American drama film directed by Mark Robson, about three wives whose husbands are missing in action in Vietnam. It stars Kate Jackson, Kathleen Nolan and Katherine Justice. It is based on a story by Joan Micklin Silver inspired by interviews Silver conducted with actual P.O.W. and M.I.A. wives, which was serialized in McCall's magazine. Silver shares screenplay credit with James Bridges.

Plot
Three women in Florida have husbands serving in Vietnam who are reported missing in action.

Mary Kay Beull (played by Kathleen Nolan) has four children, the eldest of whom treats her with increasing hostility as she develops a friendship with Phil Garrett, a school teacher. Sharon Dornbeck (played by Katherine Justice) is married to a pilot in the Air Force and has received a telegram reporting that he has been killed. Sandy Lawton (played by Kate Jackson) was wed just two weeks before her lieutenant husband went off to Vietnam.

The three women travel to Paris together to attend a Vietnam peace conference. To their shock, a film is shown there depicting the atrocities committed by American soldiers against Vietnamese civilians. A horrified Mary Kay becomes an anti-war advocate, even testifying before a committee in Washington, D.C.

Mary Kay and Sharon's husbands are ultimately confirmed to be dead. Sandy's, however, is released in a weakened condition from a prisoner-of-war camp and she eagerly awaits his return home.

Cast
 Kathleen Nolan as Mary Kay Beull
 Katherine Justice as Sharon Dornbeck
 Kate Jackson as Sandy Lawton
 Stuart Margolin as Phil

See also
 List of American films of 1972

External links
 

1972 films
1972 drama films
1970s war drama films
Films set in 1972
American war drama films
Films about shot-down aviators
Films directed by Mark Robson
Universal Pictures films
Vietnam War films
Vietnam War prisoner of war films
Films set in Vietnam
1970s English-language films
1970s American films